Karel Hrubeš (born 16 March 1993) is a professional Czech football goalkeeper currently playing for Viktoria Žižkov.

Career
He made his career league debut for Slavia Prague on 26 July 2014 in a 2–1 away win at Slovácko.

References

External links 
 
 
 

Czech footballers
Czech expatriate footballers
Czech Republic youth international footballers
Czech Republic under-21 international footballers
1993 births
Living people
Czech First League players
Czech National Football League players
Slovak Super Liga players
SK Slavia Prague players
ŠK Slovan Bratislava players
FK Viktoria Žižkov players
Czech expatriate sportspeople in Slovakia
Expatriate footballers in Slovakia
Association football goalkeepers
Footballers from Prague